Michael O'Brien (born 1933) is a former councillor and mayor of Clonmel. He is also, allegedly a survivor of abuse at Ferryhouse and came to national prominence through his campaigning on this subject.

Early life
Born in Clonmel in 1933, O'Brien was one of 13 siblings. When he was eight years old, his mother died and he and his siblings were taken into care. He was detained in this industrial school for eight years where he was allegedly raped and beaten repeatedly. He was separated from his brother Thomas Joseph O’Brien for 40 years.

Political career
He joined Fianna Fáil at the age of 18. He was elected to Clonmel borough council, being elected mayor of Clonmel in 1993. He lost his seat at the 1999 local elections.

Advocacy
He became a campaigner for the rights of those who had been put in industrial schools in 1999 when he went public with his own experiences, founding the lobby group Right to Peace.

Appearance on Questions and Answers
He was in the audience for Questions and Answers on 25 May 2009 when he confronted Minister for Transport Noel Dempsey about the way the Commission to Inquire into Child Abuse had treated survivors of the industrial schools, pointing out that the allegedly non-adversarial process had involved him being accused of lying. He said the government should change the constitution so that the assets of the religious orders who ran the industrial schools could be frozen. He also spoke of how he still suffered nightmares about the abuse he suffered in Ferryhouse and how his experience of the questioning had led him to contemplate suicide but his wife had persuaded him not to do it.

He had been detained in St Joseph's Industrial School, Clonmel

The audience applauded him for speaking out. The presenter John Bowman said that Michael O'Briens' speech was the most memorable moment in 23 years of the show.

Personal beliefs
While O'Brien is still a Catholic, he rarely goes to church.

References

External links
Video clip of Michael O'Brien speaking on Questions and Answers
Irish Central: "Leading Irish church abuse figure once claimed he was never abused" by Patrick O'Connor; 24 May 2010

1933 births
Living people
Mayors of places in the Republic of Ireland
Fianna Fáil politicians
Local councillors in South Tipperary
People from Clonmel